Dineutus carolinus is a species of whirligig beetle in the family Gyrinidae. It is found in the Caribbean Sea, Central America, and North America.

References

Further reading

External links

 

Gyrinidae
Articles created by Qbugbot
Beetles described in 1868